Preeti, also: Preety, Preity, Priti, or Prethy, is a female given name in India.

Etymology 
The name Preeti is derived from the Sanskrit word "प्रीति" (prīti), meaning "pleasure", "joy", "kindness", "favor", "grace", "love", from प्री (prī). Priti is the name of the second consort of the Hindu god of love, Kamadeva.

Preeti in Indian languages 
 Assamese: প্রীতি
 Bengali: প্রীতি
 Bhojpuri: प्रीति
 Bishnupriya Manipuri: প্রীতি
 Gujarati: પ્રીતિ
 Hindi: प्रीति
 Kannada: ಪ್ರೀತಿ
 Maithili: प्रीति
 Malayalam: പ്രീതി
 Marathi: प्रीती
 Nepali: प्रीति
 Punjabi: ਪ੍ਰੀਤੀ
 Western Punjabi: پریتی
 Tamil: பிரீத்தி
 Telugu: ప్రీతి

Notable people named Preeti 
 Preeti Amin, Indian television actress and reality show participant 
 Preeti Bose (born 1992), Indian cricketer
 Preeti Desai (born 1984), Indian actress, supermodel and former winner of 2006 Miss Great Britain
 Preeti Dimri (born 1986), Indian cricketer
 Preeti Dubey, Indian field hockey player
 Preeti Ganguly (1953–2012), Indian actress
 Preeti Jhangiani (born 1980), Indian actress
 Preeti Kaur (born 1981), Indian-Nepalese singer
 Preeti Malhotra (born 1965), Indian businesswoman
 Preeti Sagar, Indian Bollywood playback singer
 Preeti Shenoy (born 1971), Indian writer
 Preeti Singh (born 1971), Indian writer and editor
 Preeti Sudan, Indian politician and Health Secretary of India
 Preeti Tomar, Indian politician and member of the Delhi Legislative Assembly

Notable people named Preity 
 Preity Zinta (born 1975), Indian film actress and model

Notable people named Priti 
 Priti Menon (born 24 September 1985), Indian model, singer and psychologist
 Priti Paintal (born 1960) Indian composer, performer, producer and promoter
 Priti Patel (born 1972), British politician, MP and minister
 Priti Rijal (born 1991), Nepali tennis player
 Priti Sapru (born 24 December 1957), Indian actress
 Priti Sengupta, Indian Gujarati poet and writer
 Priti Shankar (1947-2011), Indian teacher, researcher, and educationist

Fictional characters 
 Preeti Choraria, from British soap opera EastEnders

See also
 Preeti & Pinky, Indipop duo singers

Hindu given names
Indian feminine given names